Family Re-Union is an annual conference, hosted by former Vice President of the United States Al Gore and Tipper Gore, in Nashville, Tennessee whose goal is to bring together families and those who work with them to talk and design better ways to strengthen family life in America. At the center of Family Re-Union is the belief that programs and guidelines should respond to the needs of families and communities, and should build on their strengths.

External links
Official site of the Gores's Family Re-Union Program

Family in the United States